Moseykovo is a rural locality (a selo) in Podlesnoye Rural Settlement, Vologodsky District, Vologda Oblast, Russia. The population was 584 as of 2002.

Geography 
Moseykovo is located 13 km southeast from Vologda (the district's administrative centre) by road. Snasudovo is the nearest rural locality.

References 

Rural localities in Vologodsky District